Deliathis incana is a species of beetle in the family Cerambycidae. It was described by Forster in 1771.

References

Lamiini
Beetles described in 1771